The École Camondo is a five-year private school of product design and interior architecture located in Paris, France, which was created in 1944 and was recognized by the French Ministry of Education in 1989. It is named after the Camondo family, a European family of Jewish financiers and philanthropists.

Notable former students 

 Pierre Paulin, designer
 Patrick Bouchain, architect
 Jean-Michel Wilmotte, architect, urban designer 
 Patrick Rubin, architect 
 Jacques Grange, interior designer
 Philippe Starck, designer
 Tran Nu Yen Khe, Vietnamese-born French actress
 Robert Couturier, interior architect

External links

 Official web Site

Education in Paris
Architecture schools in France